An inductively coupled plasma (ICP) or transformer coupled plasma (TCP) is a type of plasma source in which the energy is supplied by electric currents which are produced by electromagnetic induction, that is, by time-varying magnetic fields.

Operation

There are three types of ICP geometries: planar (Fig. 3 (a)), cylindrical  (Fig. 3 (b)), and half-toroidal (Fig. 3 (c)).

In planar geometry, the electrode is a length of flat metal wound like a spiral (or coil). In cylindrical geometry, it is like a helical spring. In half-toroidal geometry, it is toroidal solenoid cut along its main diameter to two equal halves.

When a time-varying electric current is passed through the coil, it creates a time-varying magnetic field around it, with flux

,

where r is the distance to the center of coil (and of the quartz tube).

According to the Faraday–Lenz's law of induction, this creates azimuthal electromotive force in the rarefied gas:

,

which corresponds to electric field strengths of

,

leading to the formation of the figure-8 electron trajectories providing a plasma generation. The dependence on r suggests that the gas ion motion is most intense in the outer region of the flame, where the temperature is the greatest. In the real torch, the flame is cooled from the outside by the cooling gas, so the hottest outer part is at thermal equilibrium. There temperature reaches 5 000–6 000 K. For more rigorous description, see Hamilton–Jacobi equation in electromagnetic fields.

The frequency of alternating current used in the RLC circuit which contains the coil is usually 27–41 MHz. To induce plasma, a spark is produced at the electrodes at the gas outlet. Argon is one example of a commonly used rarefied gas. The high temperature of the plasma allows the determination of many elements, and in addition, for about 60 elements degree of ionization in the torch exceeds 90%. The ICP torch consumes c. 1250–1550 W of power, but this depends on the elemental composition of the sample (due to different ionization energies).

The ICPs have two operation modes, called capacitive (E) mode with low plasma density and inductive (H) mode with high plasma density, and E to H heating mode transition occurs with external inputs.

Applications 
Plasma electron temperatures can range between ~6,000 K and ~10,000 K (~6 eV – ~100 eV), and are usually several orders of magnitude greater than the temperature of the neutral species. Argon ICP plasma discharge temperatures are typically ~5,500 to 6,500 K and are therefore comparable to that reached at the surface (photosphere) of the sun (~4,500 K to ~6,000 K). ICP discharges are of relatively high electron density, on the order of 1015 cm−3. As a result, ICP discharges have wide applications where a high-density plasma (HDP) is needed.

 ICP-AES, a type of atomic emission spectroscopy.
 ICP-MS, a type of mass spectrometry.
 ICP-RIE, a type of reactive-ion etching.

Another benefit of ICP discharges is that they are relatively free of contamination, because the electrodes are completely outside the reaction chamber. By contrast, in a capacitively coupled plasma (CCP), the electrodes are often placed inside the reactor and are thus exposed to the plasma and subsequent reactive chemical species.

See also
Capacitively coupled plasma
Induction plasma technology
List of plasma physics articles
Pulsed inductive thruster

References 

Electrodynamics
Spectroscopy
Ion source
Plasma physics